Novotroitskoye is a rural locality (a village) in Tavtimanovsky Selsoviet, Iglinsky District, Bashkortostan, Russia. The population was 63 as of 2010. There are 2 streets.

Geography 
Novotroitskoye is located on the right bank of the Lobovka River, 25 km east of Iglino (the district's administrative centre) by road. Kudeyevsky is the nearest rural locality.

References 

Rural localities in Iglinsky District